Eric Todd Olson is an American philosopher who specializes in metaphysics and philosophy of mind. Olson is best known for his research in the field of personal identity, and for advocating animalism, the theory that persons are animals. Olson received a BA from Reed College and a PhD from Syracuse University. Olson is currently a professor of philosophy at the University of Sheffield, a position he has held since 2003, and previously held a lectureship at Cambridge University.

Bibliography
The Human Animal: Personal Identity Without Psychology. New York: Oxford University Press, 1997.
What Are We? A Study in Personal Ontology. New York: Oxford University Press, 2007.

Notes

20th-century American philosophers
21st-century American philosophers
Philosophers of mind
Reed College alumni
Syracuse University alumni
Academics of the University of Sheffield
Academics of the University of Cambridge
Living people
Year of birth missing (living people)